Harry Collinson Owen  (1882–1956) was a British journalist and author.

Background
During World War I he edited the British Army newspaper Balkan News, for the Balkan front. He published Salonica and After in 1919, a book containing primary source material. Under the pseudonym Hugh Addison he wrote a science fiction novel, The Battle of London, about a communist take-over. He wrote further novels and non-fiction. His novel Zero was made into a film in 1928.

References

External links

1882 births
1956 deaths
British male journalists
British science fiction writers
20th-century British novelists
British male novelists
20th-century British male writers
Members of the Order of the British Empire